Alishanimyia is a genus of fly in the family Dolichopodidae. It contains only one species, Alishanimyia elmohardyi, and is known only from montane forests at 2400 m in Taiwan. Alishanimyia is probably descended from Chrysotimus, which would make the latter genus paraphyletic.

The genus was originally named Alishania by Daniel J. Bickel in 2004, named after Alishan, a locality in Taiwan where all specimens of the species were collected; however, this name was preoccupied by Alishania Vilbaste, 1969, so it was renamed to Alishanimyia by Bickel in 2007.

The specific name, elmohardyi, was named in memory of D. Elmo Hardy.

References

Peloropeodinae
Dolichopodidae genera
Diptera of Asia
Insects of Taiwan
Monotypic Diptera genera
Endemic fauna of Taiwan